Stepan Mnatsakanian (1917–1994) was a Soviet Armenian architect. He headed the Architecture Department of the Institute of Arts of the Armenian Academy of Sciences between 1983 and 1988.

See also
Alexander Sahinian
Murad Hasratyan

References

Armenian architects
20th-century Armenian architects
Soviet architects
Soviet Armenians
1917 births
1994 deaths